Elections were held in the Australian state of Queensland on 18 May 1907 to elect the 72 members of the state's Legislative Assembly. The election was the first one in which women had a right to vote.

The election was the first held since Premier William Kidston, formerly of the Labour Party, had founded a new movement with his own supporters as well as the Parliamentary Conservatives. The end result of the election was an improvement in Kidston's position, although he was still in minority government with Labour support. The main opposition group was Robert Philp's Conservatives.

Key dates

Results
Seat changes indicated are those caused by the election; at the preceding election, Labour had 34 seats, Ministerial 21, Conservative 15 and Independent 2.

|}

 220,189 electors were enrolled to vote at the election, but 4 seats (5.6% of the total) were uncontested—one Labor seat representing 1,352 enrolled voters, and three Conservative seats representing 4,604 voters. 
 In 11 electorates, voters had two votes each, so the total number of votes exceeds the total number of voters.

Electoral system
The election for the Legislative Assembly was held using the "contingent vote". The Legislative Council was a fully nominated body.

Electoral system changes
This election was the first held since women in Queensland gained the right to vote, although indigenous women did not gain the right until 1962.

See also
 Members of the Queensland Legislative Assembly, 1904–1907
 Members of the Queensland Legislative Assembly, 1907–1908
 First Kidston Ministry

References

External links

Elections in Queensland
1907 elections in Australia
1900s in Queensland
May 1907 events